Farber is a surname. Notable people with the surname include:

 Barry Farber (1930–2020), American radio talk show host
 Barry J. Farber, American motivational speaker
 Bernie Farber, former CEO of Canadian Jewish Congress
 Celia Farber, American print journalist and author
 David J. Farber, American professor of computer science
 Dennis H. Farber (1946–2017), American painter and photographer
 Eduard Farber (1892–1969), Austrian-American chemist and historian of chemistry
 Emmanuel Farber (1918–2014), Canadian-American physician, pathologist, biochemist, and oncologist
 Hap Farber (born 1948), American football player
 Jerry Farber (born 1935), American educator and writer
 Manny Farber (19172008), American painter, film critic and writer
 Marvin Farber, American philosopher
 Norma Farber (19091984), American children's book writer and poet
 Robert Farber, American photographer
 Sam Farber (19242013), American industrial designer and businessman
 Samuel Farber, American writer born and raised in Cuba
 Sasha Farber (born 1984), professional dancer on Dancing with the Stars
 Sidney Farber (1903–1973), "father" of modern chemotherapy
 Stacey Farber (born 1987), Canadian actress 
 Zulima Farber (born 1944), former Attorney General, Acting Governor of New Jersey

Fictional characters
Chris Farber, a character in the 1994 American TV miniseries V The Final Battle

See also 
 Faerber, also spelled Färber, a surname
 Ferber
 Dana–Farber Cancer Institute
 Farber disease

Jewish surnames